Booker Taliaferro Washington (April 5, 1856November 14, 1915) was an American educator, author, orator, and adviser to several presidents of the United States. Between 1890 and 1915, Washington was the dominant leader in the African-American community and of the contemporary black elite. Washington was from the last generation of black American leaders born into slavery and became the leading voice of the former slaves and their descendants. They were newly oppressed in the South by disenfranchisement and the Jim Crow discriminatory laws enacted in the post-Reconstruction Southern states in the late 19th and early 20th centuries.

Washington was a key proponent of African-American businesses and one of the founders of the National Negro Business League. His base was the Tuskegee Institute, a normal school, later a historically black college in Tuskegee, Alabama, at which he served as principal. As lynchings in the South reached a peak in 1895, Washington gave a speech, known as the "Atlanta compromise", that brought him national fame. He called for black progress through education and entrepreneurship, rather than trying to challenge directly the Jim Crow segregation and the disenfranchisement of black voters in the South.

Washington mobilized a nationwide coalition of middle-class blacks, church leaders, and white philanthropists and politicians, with a long-term goal of building the community's economic strength and pride by a focus on self-help and schooling. With his own contributions to the black community, Washington was a supporter of racial uplift, but, secretly, he also supported court challenges to segregation and to restrictions on voter registration.

Washington had the ear of the powerful in the America of his day, including presidents. His mastery of the American political system in the later 19th century allowed him to manipulate the media, raise money, develop strategy, network, distribute funds, and reward a cadre of supporters. Because of his influential leadership, the timespan of his activity, from 1880 to 1915, has been called the Age of Booker T. Washington. Nevertheless, opposition to Washington grew, as it became clear that his Atlanta compromise did not produce the promised improvement for most black Americans in the South. William Monroe Trotter and W. E. B. Du Bois, whom Bookerites perceived in an antebellum way as "northern blacks", found Washington too accommodationist and his industrial ("agricultural and mechanical") education inadequate. Washington fought vigorously against them and succeeded in his opposition to the Niagara Movement that they tried to found but could not prevent their formation of the NAACP, whose views became mainstream.

Black activists in the North, led by Du Bois, at first supported the Atlanta compromise, but later disagreed and opted to set up the National Association for the Advancement of Colored People (NAACP) to work for political change. They tried with limited success to challenge Washington's political machine for leadership in the black community, but built wider networks among white allies in the North. Decades after Washington's death in 1915, the civil rights movement of the 1950s took a more active and progressive approach, which was also based on new grassroots organizations based in the South, such as Congress of Racial Equality (CORE), the Student Nonviolent Coordinating Committee (SNCC) and Southern Christian Leadership Conference (SCLC).

Washington's legacy has been controversial in the civil rights community. After his death in 1915, he came under heavy criticism for accommodationism to white supremacy, despite his claims that his long-term goal was to end the disenfranchisement of African Americans, the vast majority of whom still lived in the South. However, a more neutral view has appeared since the late 20th century. As of 2010, most recent studies "defend and celebrate his accomplishments, legacy, and leadership".

Overview 
In 1856, Washington was born into slavery in Virginia as the son of Jane, an African-American slave. After emancipation, she moved the family to West Virginia to join her husband, Washington Ferguson. West Virginia had seceded from Virginia and joined the Union as a free state during the Civil War. As a young man, Booker T. Washington worked his way through Hampton Normal and Agricultural Institute (a historically black college, now Hampton University) and attended college at Wayland Seminary (now Virginia Union University).

In 1881, the young Washington was named as the first leader of the new Tuskegee Institute in Alabama, founded for the higher education of blacks. He developed the college from the ground up, enlisting students in construction of buildings, from classrooms to dormitories. Work at the college was considered fundamental to students' larger education. They maintained a large farm to be essentially self-supporting, rearing animals and cultivating needed produce. Washington continued to expand the school. He attained national prominence for his Atlanta Address of 1895, which attracted the attention of politicians and the public. He became a popular spokesperson for African-American citizens.  He built a nationwide network of supporters in many black communities, with black ministers, educators, and businessmen composing his core supporters. Washington played a dominant role in black politics, winning wide support in the black community of the South and among more liberal whites (especially rich Northern whites). He gained access to top national leaders in politics, philanthropy and education. Washington's efforts included cooperating with white people and enlisting the support of wealthy philanthropists. Washington had asserted that the surest way for blacks to gain equal social rights was to demonstrate "industry, thrift, intelligence and property".

Beginning in 1912, he developed a relationship with Jewish philanthropist Julius Rosenwald, the owner of Sears Roebuck, who served on the board of trustees for the rest of his life and made substantial donations to Tuskegee. In addition, they collaborated on a pilot program for Tuskegee architects to design six model schools for African-American students in rural areas of the South. Such schools were historically underfunded by the state and local governments. Given their success in 1913 and 1914, Rosenwald established the Rosenwald Foundation in 1917 to aid schools. It provided matching funds to communities that committed to operate the schools and for the construction and maintenance of schools, with cooperation of white public school boards required. Nearly 5,000 new, small rural schools were built for black students throughout the South, most after Washington's death in 1915.

Northern critics called Washington's widespread and powerful organization the "Tuskegee Machine". After 1909, Washington was criticized by the leaders of the new NAACP, especially W. E. B. Du Bois, who demanded a stronger tone of protest in order to advance the civil rights agenda. Washington replied that confrontation would lead to disaster for the outnumbered blacks in society, and that cooperation with supportive whites was the only way to overcome pervasive racism in the long run. At the same time, he secretly funded litigation for civil rights cases, such as challenges to Southern constitutions and laws that had disenfranchised blacks across the South since the turn of the century.  African Americans were still strongly affiliated with the Republican Party, and Washington was on close terms with national Republican Party leaders. He was often asked for political advice by presidents Theodore Roosevelt and William Howard Taft.

In addition to his contributions to education, Washington wrote 14 books; his autobiography, Up from Slavery, first published in 1901, is still widely read today. During a difficult period of transition, he did much to improve the working relationship between the races. His work greatly helped blacks to achieve education, financial power, and understanding of the U.S. legal system. This contributed to blacks' attaining the skills to create and support the civil rights movement, leading to the passage in the later 20th century of important federal civil rights laws.

Early life 

Booker was born into slavery to Jane, an enslaved African-American woman on the plantation of James Burroughs in southwest Virginia, near Hale's Ford in Franklin County. He never knew the day, month, and year of his birth (although evidence emerged after his death that he was born on April 5, 1856). Nor did he ever know his father, said to be a white man who resided on a neighboring plantation. The man played no financial or emotional role in Washington's life.

From his earliest years, Washington was known simply as "Booker", with no middle or surname, in the practice of the time. His mother, her relatives and his siblings struggled with the demands of slavery. He later wrote:

I cannot remember a single instance during my childhood or early boyhood when our entire family sat down to the table together, and God's blessing was asked, and the family ate a meal in a civilized manner. On the plantation in Virginia, and even later, meals were gotten to the children very much as dumb animals get theirs. It was a piece of bread here and a scrap of meat there. It was a cup of milk at one time and some potatoes at another.

When he was nine, Booker and his family in Virginia gained freedom under the Emancipation Proclamation as U.S. troops occupied their region. Booker was thrilled by the formal day of their emancipation in early 1865:

As the great day drew nearer, there was more singing in the slave quarters than usual. It was bolder, had more ring, and lasted later into the night. Most of the verses of the plantation songs had some reference to freedom.... [S]ome man who seemed to be a stranger (a United States officer, I presume) made a little speech and then read a rather long paper—the Emancipation Proclamation, I think. After the reading we were told that we were all free, and could go when and where we pleased. My mother, who was standing by my side, leaned over and kissed her children, while tears of joy ran down her cheeks. She explained to us what it all meant, that this was the day for which she had been so long praying, but fearing that she would never live to see.

After emancipation Jane took her family to the free state of West Virginia to join her husband, Washington Ferguson, who had escaped from slavery during the war and settled there. The illiterate boy Booker began painstakingly to teach himself to read and attended school for the first time.

At school, Booker was asked for a surname for registration. He took the family name of Washington, after his stepfather. Still later he learned from his mother that she had originally given him the name "Booker Taliaferro" at the time of his birth,  but his second name was not used by the master. Upon learning of his original name, Washington immediately readopted it as his own, and became known as Booker Taliaferro Washington for the rest of his life.

Booker loved books:

Higher education 
Washington worked in salt furnaces and coal mines in West Virginia for several years to earn money. He made his way east to Hampton Institute, a school established in Virginia to educate freedmen and their descendants, where he also worked to pay for his studies. He later attended Wayland Seminary in Washington, D.C. in 1878.

Tuskegee Institute 

In 1881, the Hampton Institute president Samuel C. Armstrong recommended Washington, then age 25, to become the first leader of Tuskegee Normal and Industrial Institute (later Tuskegee Institute, now Tuskegee University), the new normal school (teachers' college) in Alabama. The new school opened on July 4, 1881, initially using a room donated by Butler Chapel A.M.E. Zion Church.

The next year, Washington purchased a former plantation to be developed as the permanent site of the campus. Under his direction, his students literally built their own school: making bricks, constructing classrooms, barns and outbuildings; and growing their own crops and raising livestock; both for learning and to provide for most of the basic necessities. Both men and women had to learn trades as well as academics. The Tuskegee faculty used all the activities to teach the students basic skills to take back to their mostly rural black communities throughout the South. The main goal was not to produce farmers and tradesmen, but teachers of farming and trades who could teach in the new lower schools and colleges for blacks across the South. The school expanded over the decades, adding programs and departments, to become the present-day Tuskegee University.

The Oaks, "a large comfortable home," was built on campus for Washington and his family. They moved into the house in 1900. Washington lived there until his death in 1915. His widow, Margaret, lived at The Oaks until her death in 1925.

Later career 
Washington led Tuskegee for more than 30 years after becoming its leader. As he developed it, adding to both the curriculum and the facilities on the campus, he became a prominent national leader among African Americans, with considerable influence with wealthy white philanthropists and politicians.

Washington expressed his vision for his race through the school. He believed that by providing needed skills to society, African Americans would play their part, leading to acceptance by white Americans. He believed that blacks would eventually gain full participation in society by acting as responsible, reliable American citizens. Shortly after the Spanish–American War, President William McKinley and most of his cabinet visited Booker Washington. By his death in 1915, Tuskegee had grown to encompass more than 100 well equipped buildings, roughly 1,500 students, 200 faculty members teaching 38 trades and professions, and an endowment of approximately $2 million.

Washington helped develop other schools and colleges. In 1891 he lobbied the West Virginia legislature to locate the newly authorized West Virginia Colored Institute (today West Virginia State University) in the Kanawha Valley of West Virginia near Charleston. He visited the campus often and spoke at its first commencement exercise.

Washington was a dominant figure of the African-American community, then still overwhelmingly based in the South, from 1890 to his death in 1915. His Atlanta Address of 1895 received national attention. He was considered as a popular spokesman for African-American citizens. Representing the last generation of black leaders born into slavery, Washington was generally perceived as a supporter of education for freedmen and their descendants in the post-Reconstruction, Jim Crow-era South. He stressed basic education and training in manual and domestic labor trades because he thought these represented the skills needed in what was still a rural economy.

Throughout the final twenty years of his life, he maintained his standing through a nationwide network of supporters including black educators, ministers, editors, and businessmen, especially those who supported his views on social and educational issues for blacks. He also gained access to top national white leaders in politics, philanthropy and education, raised large sums, was consulted on race issues, and was awarded honorary degrees from Harvard University in 1896 and Dartmouth College in 1901.

Late in his career, Washington was criticized by civil rights leader and NAACP founder W. E. B. Du Bois.  Du Bois and his supporters opposed the Atlanta Address as the "Atlanta Compromise", because it suggested that African Americans should work for, and submit to, white political rule.  Du Bois insisted on full civil rights, due process of law, and increased political representation for African Americans which, he believed, could only be achieved through activism and higher education for African Americans. He believed that "the talented Tenth" would lead the race. Du Bois labeled Washington, "the Great Accommodator." Washington responded that confrontation could lead to disaster for the outnumbered blacks, and that cooperation with supportive whites was the only way to overcome racism in the long run.

While promoting moderation, Washington contributed secretly and substantially to mounting legal challenges activist African Americans launched against segregation and disenfranchisement of blacks. In his public role, he believed he could achieve more by skillful accommodation to the social realities of the age of segregation.

Washington's work on education helped him enlist both the moral and substantial financial support of many major white philanthropists. He became a friend of such self-made men as Standard Oil magnate Henry Huttleston Rogers; Sears, Roebuck and Company President Julius Rosenwald; and George Eastman, inventor of roll film, founder of Eastman Kodak, and developer of a major part of the photography industry. These individuals and many other wealthy men and women funded his causes, including Hampton and Tuskegee institutes.

He also gave lectures to raise money for the school. On January 23, 1906, he lectured at Carnegie Hall in New York in the Tuskegee Institute Silver Anniversary Lecture. He spoke along with great orators of the day, including Mark Twain, Joseph Hodges Choate, and Robert Curtis Ogden; it was the start of a capital campaign to raise $1,800,000 for the school.

The schools which Washington supported were founded primarily to produce teachers, as education was critical for the black community following emancipation. Freedmen strongly supported literacy and education as the keys to their future. When graduates returned to their largely impoverished rural southern communities, they still found few schools and educational resources, as the white-dominated state legislatures consistently underfunded black schools in their segregated system.

To address those needs, in the 20th century, Washington enlisted his philanthropic network to create matching funds programs to stimulate construction of numerous rural public schools for black children in the South. Working especially with Julius Rosenwald from Chicago, Washington had Tuskegee architects develop model school designs. The Rosenwald Fund helped support the construction and operation of more than 5,000 schools and related resources for the education of blacks throughout the South in the late 19th and early 20th centuries. The local schools were a source of communal pride; African-American families gave labor, land and money to them, to give their children more chances in an environment of poverty and segregation. A major part of Washington's legacy, the model rural schools continued to be constructed into the 1930s, with matching funds for communities from the Rosenwald Fund.

Washington also contributed to the Progressive Era by forming the National Negro Business League. It encouraged entrepreneurship among black businessmen, establishing a national network.

His autobiography, Up from Slavery, first published in 1901, is still widely read in the early 21st century.

Marriages and children 

Washington was married three times. In his autobiography Up from Slavery, he gave all three of his wives credit for their contributions at Tuskegee.  His first wife Fannie N. Smith was from Malden, West Virginia, the same Kanawha River Valley town where Washington had lived from age nine to sixteen. He maintained ties there all his life, and Smith was a student of his when he taught in Malden. He helped her gain entrance into the Hampton Institute. Washington and Smith were married in the summer of 1882, a year after he became principal there. They had one child, Portia M. Washington, born in 1883. Fannie died in May 1884.

In 1885, the widower Washington married again, to Olivia A. Davidson (1854–1889).  Born free in Virginia to a free woman of color and a father who had been freed from slavery, she moved with her family to the free state of Ohio, where she attended common schools. Davidson later studied at Hampton Institute and went North to study at the Massachusetts State Normal School at Framingham. She taught in Mississippi and Tennessee before going to Tuskegee to work as a teacher. Washington recruited Davidson to Tuskegee, and promoted her to vice-principal. They had two sons, Booker T. Washington Jr. and Ernest Davidson Washington, before she died in 1889.

In 1893, Washington married Margaret James Murray. She was from Mississippi and had graduated from Fisk University, a historically black college. They had no children together, but she helped rear Washington's three children. Murray outlived Washington and died in 1925.

Politics and the Atlanta compromise 

Washington's 1895 Atlanta Exposition address was viewed as a "revolutionary moment" by both African Americans and whites across the country. At the time W. E. B. Du Bois supported him, but they grew apart as Du Bois sought more action to remedy disfranchisement and improve educational opportunities for blacks. After their falling out, Du Bois and his supporters referred to Washington's speech as the "Atlanta Compromise" to express their criticism that Washington was too accommodating to white interests.

Washington advocated a "go slow" approach to avoid a harsh white backlash. He has been criticized for encouraging many youths in the South to accept sacrifices of potential political power, civil rights, and higher education.  Washington believed that African Americans should "concentrate all their energies on industrial education, and accumulation of wealth, and the conciliation of the South". He valued the "industrial" education, as it provided critical skills for the jobs then available to the majority of African Americans at the time, as most lived in the South, which was overwhelmingly rural and agricultural. He thought these skills would lay the foundation for the creation of stability that the African-American community required in order to move forward.  He believed that in the long term, "blacks would eventually gain full participation in society by showing themselves to be responsible, reliable American citizens".  His approach advocated for an initial step toward equal rights, rather than full equality under the law, gaining economic power to back up black demands for political equality in the future.  He believed that such achievements would prove to the deeply prejudiced white America that African Americans were not "'naturally' stupid and incompetent".

Well-educated blacks in the North lived in a different society and advocated a different approach, in part due to their perception of wider opportunities. Du Bois wanted blacks to have the same "classical" liberal arts education as upper-class whites did, along with voting rights and civic equality. The latter two had been ostensibly granted since 1870 by constitutional amendments after the Civil War. He believed that an elite, which he called the Talented Tenth, would advance to lead the race to a wider variety of occupations.  Du Bois and Washington were divided in part by differences in treatment of African Americans in the North versus the South; although both groups suffered discrimination, the mass of blacks in the South were far more constrained by legal segregation and disenfranchisement, which totally excluded most from the political process and system. Many in the North objected to being 'led', and authoritatively spoken for, by a Southern accommodationist strategy which they considered to have been "imposed on them [Southern blacks] primarily by Southern whites".

Historian Clarence Earl Walker wrote that, for white Southerners,
Free black people were 'matter out of place'. Their emancipation was an affront to southern white freedom. Booker T. Washington did not understand that his program was perceived as subversive of a natural order in which black people were to remain forever subordinate or unfree.

Both Washington and Du Bois sought to define the best means post-Civil War to improve the conditions of the African-American community through education.

Blacks were solidly Republican in this period, having gained emancipation and suffrage with President Lincoln and his party. Fellow Republican President Ulysses S. Grant defended African Americans' newly won freedom and civil rights in the South by passing laws and using federal force to suppress the Ku Klux Klan, which had committed violence against blacks for years to suppress voting and discourage education. After Federal troops left in 1877 at the end of the Reconstruction era, many paramilitary groups worked to suppress black voting by violence. From 1890 to 1908 Southern states disenfranchised most blacks and many poor whites through constitutional amendments and statutes that created barriers to voter registration and voting. Such devices as poll taxes and subjective literacy tests sharply reduced the number of blacks in voting rolls. By the late nineteenth century, Southern white Democrats defeated some biracial Populist-Republican coalitions and regained power in the state legislatures of the former Confederacy; they passed laws establishing racial segregation and Jim Crow. In the border states and North, blacks continued to exercise the vote; the well-established Maryland African-American community defeated attempts there to disfranchise them.

Washington worked and socialized with many national white politicians and industry leaders.  He developed the ability to persuade wealthy whites, many of them self-made men, to donate money to black causes by appealing to their values. He argued that the surest way for blacks to gain equal social rights was to demonstrate "industry, thrift, intelligence and property".  He believed these were key to improved conditions for African Americans in the United States. Because African Americans had recently been emancipated and most lived in a hostile environment, Washington believed they could not expect too much at once.  He said, "I have learned that success is to be measured not so much by the position that one has reached in life as by the obstacles which he has had to overcome while trying to succeed."

Along with Du Bois, Washington partly organized the "Negro exhibition" at the 1900 Exposition Universelle in Paris, where photos of Hampton Institute's black students were displayed. These were taken by his friend Frances Benjamin Johnston. The exhibition demonstrated African Americans' positive contributions to United States' society.

Washington privately contributed substantial funds for legal challenges to segregation and disfranchisement, such as the case of Giles v. Harris, which was heard before the United States Supreme Court in 1903. Even when such challenges were won at the Supreme Court, southern states quickly responded with new laws to accomplish the same ends, for instance, adding "grandfather clauses" that covered whites and not blacks in order to prevent blacks from voting.

Wealthy friends and benefactors 

State and local governments historically underfunded black schools, although they were ostensibly providing "separate but equal" segregated facilities. White philanthropists strongly supported education financially. Washington encouraged them and directed millions of their money to projects all across the South that Washington thought best reflected his self-help philosophy. Washington associated with the richest and most powerful businessmen and politicians of the era. He was seen as a spokesperson for African Americans and became a conduit for funding educational programs.

His contacts included such diverse and well known entrepreneurs and philanthropists as Andrew Carnegie, William Howard Taft, John D. Rockefeller, Henry Huttleston Rogers, George Eastman, Julius Rosenwald, Robert Curtis Ogden, Collis Potter Huntington and William Henry Baldwin Jr. The latter donated large sums of money to agencies such as the Jeanes and Slater Funds. As a result, countless small rural schools were established through Washington's efforts, under programs that continued many years after his death. Along with rich white men, the black communities helped their communities directly by donating time, money and labor to schools to match the funds required.

Henry Huttleston Rogers 

A representative case of an exceptional relationship was Washington's friendship with millionaire industrialist and financier Henry H. Rogers (1840–1909). Henry Rogers was a self-made man, who had risen from a modest working-class family to become a principal officer of Standard Oil, and one of the richest men in the United States. Around 1894, Rogers heard Washington speak at Madison Square Garden. The next day, he contacted Washington and requested a meeting, during which Washington later recounted that he was told that Rogers "was surprised that no one had 'passed the hat' after the speech". The meeting began a close relationship that extended over a period of 15 years. Although Washington and the very private Rogers were seen as friends, the true depth and scope of their relationship was not publicly revealed until after Rogers's sudden death of a stroke in May 1909. Washington was a frequent guest at Rogers's New York office, his Fairhaven, Massachusetts summer home, and aboard his steam yacht Kanawha.

A few weeks later, Washington went on a previously planned speaking tour along the newly completed Virginian Railway, a $40-million enterprise that had been built almost entirely from Rogers's personal fortune. As Washington rode in the late financier's private railroad car, Dixie, he stopped and made speeches at many locations. His companions later recounted that he had been warmly welcomed by both black and white citizens at each stop.

Washington revealed that Rogers had been quietly funding operations of 65 small country schools for African Americans, and had given substantial sums of money to support Tuskegee and Hampton institutes. He also noted that Rogers had encouraged programs with matching funds requirements so the recipients had a stake in the outcome.

Anna T. Jeanes 
In 1907 Philadelphia Quaker Anna T. Jeanes (1822–1907) donated one million dollars to Washington for elementary schools for black children in the South. Her contributions and those of Henry Rogers and others funded schools in many poor communities.

Julius Rosenwald 
Julius Rosenwald (1862–1932) was a Jewish American self-made wealthy man with whom Washington found common ground. By 1908, Rosenwald, son of an immigrant clothier, had become part-owner and president of Sears, Roebuck and Company in Chicago. Rosenwald was a philanthropist who was deeply concerned about the poor state of African-American education, especially in the segregated Southern states, where their schools were underfunded.

In 1912 l, Rosenwald was asked to serve on the Board of Directors of Tuskegee Institute, a position he held for the remainder of his life. Rosenwald endowed Tuskegee so that Washington could spend less time fundraising and more managing the school. Later in 1912, Rosenwald provided funds to Tuskegee for a pilot program to build six new small schools in rural Alabama. They were designed, constructed and opened in 1913 and 1914, and overseen by Tuskegee architects and staff; the model proved successful.

After Washington died in 1915, Rosenwald established the Rosenwald Fund in 1917, primarily to serve African-American students in rural areas throughout the South. The school building program was one of its largest programs. Using the architectural model plans developed by professors at Tuskegee Institute, the Rosenwald Fund spent over $4 million to help build 4,977 schools, 217 teachers' homes, and 163 shop buildings in 883 counties in 15 states, from Maryland to Texas. The Rosenwald Fund made matching grants, requiring community support, cooperation from the white school boards, and local fundraising. Black communities raised more than $4.7 million to aid the construction and sometimes donated land and labor; essentially they taxed themselves twice to do so. These schools became informally known as Rosenwald Schools. But the philanthropist did not want them to be named for him, as they belonged to their communities. By his death in 1932, these newer facilities could accommodate one-third of all African-American children in Southern U.S. schools.

Up from Slavery to the White House 

Washington's long-term adviser, Timothy Thomas Fortune (1856–1928), was a respected African-American economist and editor of The New York Age, the most widely read newspaper in the black community within the United States. He was the ghost-writer and editor of Washington's first autobiography, The Story of My Life and Work. Washington published five books during his lifetime with the aid of ghost-writers Timothy Fortune, Max Bennett Thrasher and Robert E. Park.

They included compilations of speeches and essays:
 The Story of My Life and Work (1900)
 Up from Slavery (1901)
 The Story of the Negro: The Rise of the Race from Slavery  (2 vols., 1909)
 My Larger Education (1911)
 The Man Farthest Down (1912)

In an effort to inspire the "commercial, agricultural, educational, and industrial advancement" of African Americans, Washington founded the National Negro Business League (NNBL) in 1900.

When Washington's second autobiography, Up from Slavery, was published in 1901, it became a bestseller—remaining the best-selling autobiography of an African American for over sixty years—and had a major effect on the African-American community and its friends and allies.

Dinner at the White House

In October 1901, President Theodore Roosevelt invited Washington to dine with him and his family at the White House. Although Republican presidents had met privately with black leaders, this was the first highly publicized social occasion when an African American was invited there on equal terms by the president. Democratic Party  politicians from the South, including future governor of Mississippi James K. Vardaman and Senator Benjamin Tillman of South Carolina, indulged in racist personal attacks when they learned of the invitation. Both used the derogatory term for African Americans in their statements.

Vardaman described the White House as "so saturated with the odor of the nigger that the rats have taken refuge in the stable," and declared, "I am just as much opposed to Booker T. Washington as a voter as I am to the cocoanut-headed, chocolate-colored typical little coon who blacks my shoes every morning. Neither is fit to perform the supreme function of citizenship." Tillman said, "The action of President Roosevelt in entertaining that nigger will necessitate our killing a thousand niggers in the South before they will learn their place again."

Ladislaus Hengelmüller von Hengervár, the Austro-Hungarian ambassador to the United States, who was visiting the White House on the same day, said he found a rabbit's foot in Washington's coat pocket when he mistakenly put on the coat.  The Washington Post described it as "the left hind foot of a graveyard rabbit, killed in the dark of the moon". The Detroit Journal quipped the next day, "The Austrian ambassador may have made off with Booker T. Washington's coat at the White House, but he'd have a bad time trying to fill his shoes."

Death 

Despite his extensive travels and widespread work, Washington continued as principal of Tuskegee. Washington's health was deteriorating rapidly in 1915; he collapsed in New York City and was diagnosed by two different doctors as having Bright's disease, an inflammation of the kidneys, today called nephritis. Told he had only a few days left to live, Washington expressed a desire to die at Tuskegee. He boarded a train and arrived in Tuskegee shortly after midnight on November 14, 1915. He died a few hours later at the age of 59. His funeral was held on November 17, 1915, in the Tuskegee Institute Chapel. It was attended by nearly 8,000 people. He was buried nearby in the Tuskegee University Campus Cemetery.

At the time he was thought to have died of congestive heart failure, aggravated by overwork. In March 2006, his descendants permitted examination of medical records: these showed he had hypertension, with a blood pressure more than twice normal, and that he died of kidney failure brought on by high blood pressure.

At Washington's death, Tuskegee's endowment was close to $2,000,000. Washington's greatest life's work, the education of blacks in the South, was well underway and expanding.

Honors and memorials 

For his contributions to American society, Washington was granted an honorary master's degree from Harvard University in 1896, followed by an honorary doctorate from Dartmouth College.

At the center of Tuskegee University, the Booker T. Washington Monument was dedicated in 1922. Called Lifting the Veil, the monument has an inscription reading: 

In 1934, Robert Russa Moton, Washington's successor as president of Tuskegee University, arranged an air tour for two African-American aviators.  Afterward the plane was renamed as the Booker T. Washington.

On April 7, 1940, Washington became the first African American to be depicted on a United States postage stamp.

In 1942, the liberty ship Booker T. Washington was named in his honor, the first major oceangoing vessel to be named after an African American. The ship was christened by noted singer Marian Anderson.

In 1946, he was honored on the first coin to feature an African American, the Booker T. Washington Memorial half dollar, which was minted by the United States until 1951.

On April 5, 1956, the hundredth anniversary of Washington's birth, the house where he was born in Franklin County, Virginia was designated as the Booker T. Washington National Monument.

A state park in Chattanooga, Tennessee, was named in his honor, as was a bridge spanning the Hampton River adjacent to his alma mater, Hampton University.

In 1984, Hampton University dedicated a Booker T. Washington Memorial on campus near the historic Emancipation Oak, establishing, in the words of the university, "a relationship between one of America's great educators and social activists, and the symbol of Black achievement in education".

Numerous high schools, middle schools and elementary schools across the United States have been named after Booker T. Washington.

In 2000, West Virginia State University (WVSU; then West Va. State College), in cooperation with other organizations including the Booker T. Washington Association, established the Booker T. Washington Institute, to honor Washington's boyhood home, the old town of Malden, and Washington's ideals.

On October 19, 2009, WVSU dedicated a monument to Booker T. Washington. The event took place at WVSU's Booker T. Washington Park in Malden, West Virginia. The monument also honors the families of African ancestry who lived in Old Malden in the early 20th century and who knew and encouraged Washington. Special guest speakers at the event included West Virginia Governor Joe Manchin III, Malden attorney Larry L. Rowe, and the president of WVSU. Musical selections were provided by the WVSU "Marching Swarm".

At the end of the 2008 presidential election, the defeated Republican candidate Senator John McCain recalled the stir caused a century before when President Theodore Roosevelt invited Booker T. Washington to the White House. McCain noted the evident progress in the country with the election of Democratic Senator Barack Obama as the first African-American President of the United States.

Legacy

Booker T. Washington was so acclaimed as a public leader that the period of his activity, from 1880 to 1915, has been called the Age of Booker T. Washington. Historiography on Washington, his character, and the value of that leadership has varied dramatically.  After his death, he came under heavy criticism in the civil rights community for accommodationism to white supremacy. However, since the late 20th century, a more balanced view of his very wide range of activities has appeared.  As of 2010, the most recent studies, "defend and celebrate his accomplishments, legacy, and leadership".

Washington was held in high regard by business-oriented conservatives, both white and black.  Historian Eric Foner argues that the freedom movement of the late nineteenth century changed directions so as to align with America's new economic and intellectual framework. Black leaders emphasized economic self-help and individual advancement into the middle class as a more fruitful strategy than political agitation. There was emphasis on education and literacy throughout the period after the Civil War. Washington's famous Atlanta speech of 1895 marked this transition, as it called on blacks to develop their farms, their industrial skills, and their entrepreneurship as the next stage in emerging from slavery.

By this time, Mississippi had passed a new constitution, and other Southern states were following suit, or using electoral laws to raise barriers to voter registration; they completed disenfranchisement of blacks at the turn of the 20th century to maintain white supremacy. But at the same time, Washington secretly arranged to fund numerous legal challenges to such voting restrictions and segregation, which he believed was the way they had to be attacked.

Washington repudiated the historic abolitionist emphasis on unceasing agitation for full equality, advising blacks that it was counterproductive to fight segregation at that point. Foner concludes that Washington's strong support in the black community was rooted in its widespread realization that, given their legal and political realities, frontal assaults on white supremacy were impossible, and the best way forward was to concentrate on building up their economic and social structures inside segregated communities. Historian C. Vann Woodward in 1951 wrote of Washington, "The businessman's gospel of free enterprise, competition, and laissez faire never had a more loyal exponent."

Historians since the late 20th century have been divided in their characterization of Washington: some describe him as a visionary capable of "read[ing] minds with the skill of a master psychologist," who expertly played the political game in 19th-century Washington by its own rules. Others say he was a self-serving, crafty narcissist who threatened and punished those in the way of his personal interests, traveled with an entourage, and spent much time fundraising, signing autographs, and giving flowery patriotic speeches with much flag waving – acts more indicative of an artful political boss than an altruistic civil rights leader.

People called Washington the "Wizard of Tuskegee" because of his highly developed political skills and his creation of a nationwide political machine based on the black middle class, white philanthropy, and Republican Party support. Opponents called this network the "Tuskegee Machine". Washington maintained control because of his ability to gain support of numerous groups, including influential whites and black business, educational and religious communities nationwide. He advised as to the use of financial donations from philanthropists and avoided antagonizing white Southerners with his accommodation to the political realities of the age of Jim Crow segregation.

The Tuskegee machine collapsed rapidly after Washington's death. He was the charismatic leader who held it all together, with the aid of Emmett Jay Scott. But the trustees replaced Scott, and the elaborate system fell apart. Critics in the 1920s to 1960s, especially those connected with the NAACP, ridiculed Tuskegee as a producer of a class of submissive black laborers. Since the late 20th century, historians have given much more favorable view, emphasizing the school's illustrious faculty and the progressive black movements, institutions and leaders in education, politics, architecture, medicine and other professions it produced who worked hard in communities across the United States, and indeed worldwide across the African Diaspora. Deborah Morowski points out that Tuskegee's curriculum served to help students achieve a sense of personal and collective efficacy.  She concludes:
The social studies curriculum provided an opportunity for the uplift of African Americans at time when these opportunities were few and far between for black youth. The curriculum provided inspiration for African Americans to advance their standing in society, to change the view of southern whites toward the value of blacks, and ultimately, to advance racial equality.

At a time when most black Americans were poor farmers in the South and were ignored by the national black leadership, Washington's Tuskegee Institute made their needs a high priority. It lobbied for government funds and especially from philanthropies that enabled the institute to provide model farming techniques, advanced training, and organizational skills. These included Annual Negro Conferences, the Tuskegee Experiment Station, the Agricultural Short Course, the Farmers' Institutes, the Farmers' County Fairs, the Movable School, and numerous pamphlets and feature stories sent free to the South's black newspapers.

Washington took the lead in promoting educational uplift for the African Diaspora, often with funding from the Phelps Stokes Fund or in collaboration with foreign sources, such as the German government.

Descendants 
Washington's first daughter by Fannie, Portia Marshall Washington (1883–1978), was a trained pianist who married Tuskegee educator and architect William Sidney Pittman in 1900. They had three children. Pittman faced several difficulties in trying to build his practice while his wife built her musical profession. After he assaulted their daughter Fannie in the midst of an argument, Portia took Fannie and left Pittman. She resettled at Tuskegee. She was removed from the faculty in 1939 because she did not have an academic degree, but she opened her own piano teaching practice for a few years. After retiring in 1944 at the age of 61, she dedicated her efforts in the 1940s to memorializing her father. She succeeded in getting her father's bust placed in the Hall of Fame in New York, a 50-cent coin minted with his image, and his Virginia birthplace declared a National Monument. Portia Washington Pittman died on February 26, 1978, in Washington, D.C.

Booker Jr. (1887–1945) married Nettie Blair Hancock (1887–1972). Their daughter, Nettie Hancock Washington (1917–1982), became a teacher and taught at a high school in Washington, D.C., for twenty years. She married physician Frederick Douglass III (1913–1942), great-grandson of famed abolitionist and orator Frederick Douglass. Nettie and Frederick's daughter, Nettie Washington Douglass, and her son, Kenneth Morris, co-founded the Frederick Douglass Family Initiatives, an anti-sex trafficking organization.

Washington's last-born great-grandchild, Dr. Sarah Washington O'Neal Rush, is the founder of Booker T. Washington Empowerment Network, an organization created to carry on her great-grandfather's legacy of improving the lives of disadvantaged youth and their families.

Representation in other media 
 Washington and his family's visit to the White House was dramatized as the subject of an opera, A Guest of Honor, by Scott Joplin, noted African-American composer. It was first produced in 1903.
 In 1949 the anthology radio drama Destination Freedom recapped his life.
 E. L. Doctorow's 1975 novel Ragtime features a fictional version of Washington trying to negotiate the surrender of an African-American musician who is threatening to blow up the Pierpont Morgan Library. The role was played by Moses Gunn in the 1981 film adaptation.
 Washington was portrayed by Roger Guenveur Smith in the 2020 Netflix miniseries Self Made, based on the life of Madame C. J. Walker.

Works 
 The Future of the American Negro – 1899
 The Story of My Life and Work (1900)
 Up from Slavery – 1901
 Character Building – 1902
 The Souls of Black Folk (1903)
 Working with the Hands – 1904, a sequel to Up From Slavery
 Tuskegee & Its People (editor) – 1905
 Frederick Douglass – 1906 Online
 The Negro in the South (with W. E. B. Du Bois) – 1907
 The Story of the Negro: The Rise of the Race from Slavery (1909)
My Larger Education (1911)
The Man Farthest Down: A Record of Observation and Study in Europe – 1912

See also 
 African American founding fathers of the United States
 African American literature
 Booker T. Washington Junior College
 Double-duty dollar
 List of civil rights leaders
 List of things named after Booker T. Washington
 Rosenwald School
 Roscoe Simmons
 Ralph Waldo Tyler

Explanatory notes

References

Primary sources 

 .
 .
 
  Documenting the American South. Other online full-text versions available via Project Gutenberg, UNC Library
 
 
 
 
 
 
 
 
 
  Fourteen-volume set of all letters to and from Booker T. Washington.

Secondary sources 

 .
 . 

 .
 

 .  Documents Booker T. Washington's secret financing and directing of litigation against segregation and disfranchisement.
 , the major scholarly biography.
 .

 Heath, Robert L. "A time for silence: Booker T. Washington in Atlanta." Quarterly Journal of Speech 64.4 (1978): 385-399. [

 . Documents Booker T. Washington's secret financing and directing of litigation against segregation and disfranchisement.
 Moore, Jacqueline M. Booker T. Washington, WEB Du Bois, and the struggle for racial uplift (Rowman & Littlefield, 2003) online.

 
 , favorable scholarly biography.
 .

Further reading 

 Aiello, Thomas. The Battle for the Souls of Black Folk: WEB Du Bois, Booker T. Washington, and the Debate That Shaped the Course of Civil Rights (ABC-CLIO, 2016) online.

 ; 243 pp. Studies the content and influence of his philosophy of entrepreneurship.
 Chennault, Ronald E. "Pragmatism and Progressivism in the Educational Thought and Practices of Booker T. Washington." Philosophical Studies in Education 44 (2013): 121-131. online
 Christian, Mark. Booker T. Washington: A Life in American History (ABC-CLIO, 2021).
 Davis, Deborah. Guest of Honor: Booker T. Washington, Theodore Roosevelt, and the White House Dinner That Shocked a Nation (Simon and Schuster, 2012).
 Deutsch, Stephanie. You need a schoolhouse: Booker T. Washington, Julius Rosenwald, and the building of schools for the segregated south ( Northwestern University Press, 2011).

 Feiler, Andrew. A Better Life for the Children: Julius Rosenwald, Booker T. Washington, and the 4,978 Schools That Changed America (University of Georgia Press, 2021) 
 Fisher, Laura R. "Head and Hands Together: Booker T. Washington's Vocational Realism." American Literature 87.4 (2015): 709-737.
 Gardner, Booker T. "The educational contributions of Booker T. Washington." Journal of Negro Education 44.4 (1975): 502-518. online

 Gibson, Donald B. "Strategies and Revisions of Self-Representation in Booker T. Washington's Autobiographies." American Quarterly 45.3 (1993): 370-393. online
 Gottschalk, Jane. "The Rhetorical Strategy of Booker T. Washington." Phylon 27.4 (1966): 388-395. online
 Hamilton. Kenneth M. Booker T. Washington in American Memory (University of Illinois Press, 2017) online; see also online review

 Harlan, Louis R. "Booker T. Washington and the National Negro Business League" in Raymond W. Smock, ed. Booker T. Washington in Perspective: Essays of Louis R. Harlan (1988) pp. 98–109. online
 Harlan, Louis R. "Booker T. Washington and the white man's burden." American Historical Review 71.2 (1966): 441-467. online

 .
 Jackson Jr, David H. "Booker T. Washington in South Carolina, March 1909."  South Carolina Historical Magazine (2012): 192-220. online

 Lewis, Theodore. "Booker T. Washington’s audacious vocationalist philosophy." Oxford review of education 40.2 (2014): 189-205.

 Mathews, Basil Joseph, Booker T. Washington, educator and interracial interpreter (Harvard University Press, 1948)
 

 Richards, Michael A. "Pathos, Poverty, and Politics: Booker T. Washington’s Radically Reimagined American Civilization." Polity 51.4 (2019): 749-779. online

 
 

 Verney, Kevern J. The art of the possible: Booker T. Washington and Black Leadership in the United States, 1881-1925 (Routledge, 2013).
 Webb, Clive. "‘A feeling which it is impossible for Englishmen to understand’: Booker T. Washington and Anglo‐American Rivalries." History 107.376 (2022): 549-569. 
 Weiss, Ellen. Robert R. Taylor and Tuskegee: An African American Architect Designs for Booker T. Washington (NewSouth Books, 2012).
 Wintz, Cary D.African American Political Thought, 1890–1930: Washington, Du Bois, Garvey, and Randolph (1996)

Historiography 
 Bieze, Michael Scott, and Marybeth Gasman, eds. Booker T. Washington Rediscovered (Johns Hopkins University Press, 2012), 265 pp. scholarly essays
 

 Carroll, Rebecca, ed. Uncle Tom or New Negro?: African Americans Reflect on Booker T. Washington and Up from Slavery 100 Years Later (Crown, 2013).
 Crowley, John W. "Booker T. Washington Revisited." American Literary Realism 54.2 (2022): 170-181. excerpt

 
 
  Hamilton, Kenneth. Booker T. Washington in American Memory.  (University of Illinois Press, 2017) 

 
 

 Thornbrough, Emma Lou, ed. Booker T. Washington - Great Lives Observed (1969), short selections by Washington and by historians; online

 Zeringue, Joshua Thomas. "Booker T. Washington and the Historians: How Changing Views on Race Relations, Economics, and Education Shaped Washington Historiography, 1915–2010" (MA Thesis, LSU, 2015) online

External links 

 
 
 
 
 "Booker T. Washington: The Man and the Myth Revisited." (2007) PowerPoint presentation By Dana Chandler
 
 , "From Slave Cabin to the Hall of Fame"] Booker T. Washington National Monument, 2021.

 
 , index to over 300,000 items related to Washington available at the Library of Congress and on microfilm.
 "Writings of Writings of B. Washington and Du Bois" from C-SPAN's American Writers: A Journey Through History
 Booker T. Washington historical marker in Piedmont Park, Atlanta, Georgia

 Booker T. Washington Papers Editorial Project collection at the University of Maryland Libraries

 
African-American educators
African-American academics
African-American businesspeople
African-American writers
American writers
Tuskegee University presidents
Progressive Era in the United States
Alabama Republicans
Writers from Alabama
Writers from West Virginia
19th-century American slaves
African-American Christians
American freedmen
Hall of Fame for Great Americans inductees
Hampton University alumni
People from Tuskegee, Alabama
People from Franklin County, Virginia
1856 births
1915 deaths
Academics from Virginia
Academics from Alabama
African-American schoolteachers
Schoolteachers from Alabama
American academic administrators
People from Malden, West Virginia
19th-century American businesspeople
People who wrote slave narratives
African-American activists
Literate American slaves